This is a list of Bangladeshi scientists.

A 
 Abdus Sattar Khan
 Arun Kumar Basak
 A A Mamun

F 
 Fazlur Rahman Khan
 Fazley Bary Malik

H  
 Hiranmay Sen Gupta

J 
Jamal Nazrul Islam

M 
M. A. Wazed Miah
M. Zahid Hasan
Maqsudul Alam
Muhammed Zafar Iqbal

O
 M Osman Ghani

P

Q 
 Muhammad Qudrat-i-Khuda
 Qazi Motahar Hossain

S 
 Samir Kumar Saha
 Senjuti Saha

References

Bangladesh